Lithium amide or lithium azanide is an inorganic compound with the chemical formula . It is a white solid with a tetragonal crystal structure. Lithium amide can be made by treating lithium metal with liquid ammonia:

Other lithium amides
The conjugate bases of amines are known as amides. Thus, a lithium amide may also refer to any compound in the class of the lithium salt of an amine. These compounds have the general form , with the chemical lithium amide itself as the parent structure. Common lithium amides include lithium diisopropylamide (LDA), lithium tetramethylpiperidide (LiTMP), and lithium hexamethyldisilazide (LiHMDS). They are produced by the reaction of Li metal with the appropriate amine:

Lithium amides are very reactive compounds. Specifically, they are strong bases.

Examples
Lithium tetramethylpiperidide has been crystallised as a tetramer. On the other hand, the lithium derivative of bis(1-phenylethyl)amine crystallises as a trimer:

It is also possible to make mixed oligomers of metal alkoxides and amides. These are related to the superbases which are mixtures of metal alkoxides and alkyls. The cyclic oligomers form when the nitrogen of the amide forms a sigma bond to a lithium while the nitrogen lone pair binds to another metal centre.

Other organolithium compounds (such as BuLi) are generally considered to exist in and function via high-order, aggregated species.

See also
 Sodium amide
 Butyllithium

References

 Merck Index, 11th Edition, 5398.

External links

Lithium salts
Metal amides